The Cook Islands – France Maritime Delimitation Agreement is a treaty in which the two states agreed to the delimitation of the maritime boundary between the Cook Islands and French Polynesia.

The treaty was signed at Rarotonga on 3 August 1990. The boundary is approximately 650 nautical miles long and is a modified equidistant line. The treaty defines the boundary using seven straight-line maritime segments defined by eight specific coordinate points.

The official name for the treaty is Agreement on Maritime Delimitation between the Government of the Cook Islands and the Government of the French Republic. It entered into force on the day it was signed.

Notes

References
 Anderson, Ewan W. (2003). International Boundaries: A Geopolitical Atlas. Routledge: New York. ;  OCLC 54061586
 Charney, Jonathan I., David A. Colson, Robert W. Smith. (2005). International Maritime Boundaries, 5 vols. Hotei Publishing: Leiden. ; ; ; ; ;  OCLC 23254092

External links
Full text of treaty

1990 in the Cook Islands
1990 in French Polynesia
Cook Islands–French Polynesia border
Boundary treaties
Treaties of the Cook Islands
Treaties concluded in 1990
Treaties entered into force in 1990
Bilateral treaties of France
United Nations treaties
Treaties extended to French Polynesia